The New Jersey version of the NWA World Light Heavyweight Championship was a short-lived National Wrestling Alliance title recognized in the U.S. state of New Jersey in 1997 and 1998. The title used the word "light heavyweight" as the NWA World Junior Heavyweight Championship was still controlled by New Japan Pro-Wrestling at the time as part of the J-Crown.

This version of the title is in no way related to the original version of the championship, defended in the Mexican professional wrestling promotion, Consejo Mundial de Lucha Libre (CMLL), in use since the early 1950s. As a regional-based title, it was contended for by the local talent, resulting in two champions that were way over the weight limit, 911 and The Blue Meanie.

Title history

See also
National Wrestling Alliance
NWA World Light Heavyweight Championship

References

External links
History of the original NWA World Light Heavyweight Championship
History of New Jersey's NWA World Light Heavyweight Championship

National Wrestling Alliance championships
Light heavyweight wrestling championships